Poli Krasteva Karastoyanova (born 28 September 1969) is a Bulgarian politician and economist, chairman of the parliamentary Culture and Media Committee, Deputy Chairman of the Economic Policy and Tourism Committee, MP of PG 'Patriotic Front' in 43 th National Assembly.

Biography 

Poli Karastoyanova was born on September 28, 1969 in Plovdiv. She graduated in University of National and World Economy. Her master's degree "Management of PR and Mass Communication" was received in the New Bulgarian University.

She has worked for Bulgarian and foreign companies as a financial consultant. In 2003 she became executive director of the Bulgarian organization for congress tourism. One of the founders of the National Tourism Board. MP from the Patriotic Front (Bulgaria) at the 43 th National Assembly, Chairman of the Culture and Media Committee.

Poli Karastoyanova is the creator and host of specialized economic program Tourism Trend on BBT, which affected important aspects of the industry and the complex relationship between the state and the business sector. In the show she discussed with her guests key issues related to the development of tourism and international image of Bulgaria as an investment destination.

Poli Karastoyanova is a member in a number of organizations, some of which SKAL International Sofia, International Public Relations Association, International Women's Club Sofia. She is fluent in English and Portuguese.

References 

 Патриотите издигат Поли Карастоянова за комисията по култура 
 Поли Карастоянова срещу рекета на екоорганизациите за зимния туризъм 
 Поли Карастоянова - нежното оръжие на патриотите 
 Председателят на медийната комисия Поли Карастоянова поиска закон за сайтовете 
 Поли Карастоянова за Journey.bg

External links
 Официален сайт на Поли Карастоянова  
 За Поли Карастоянова 
 Официална страница на Поли Карастоянова в Parliament.bg
 Поли Карастоянова във Facebook
 Поли Карастоянова в About.me

Politicians from Plovdiv
20th-century Bulgarian economists
Bulgarian women economists
1969 births
Living people
21st-century Bulgarian economists